The 1990 San Francisco 49ers season was the franchise's 41st season in the National Football League (NFL) and their 45th overall. the team entered the 1990 season heavily favored to win their third consecutive Super Bowl. The season was highlighted by their victory over the New York Giants on Monday Night Football in Week 13. Throughout the season, the 49ers and the Giants were the two best teams in the NFL. The two teams would meet again in the NFC Championship Game.

Between 1988 and 1990, the 49ers set a league record with 18 consecutive road victories. Jerry Rice had a career year by becoming the fourth receiver in the history of American football to have at least 100 receptions in one season. The 49ers won their fifth consecutive NFC West Division Title. Dating back to 1989, the 49ers completed a fifteen-game unbeaten streak in the regular season (5 victories in the last 5 games of 1989 and 10 victories in the first ten games of 1990).

The 49ers would lose in the final seconds of the NFC Championship Game on a field goal by the eventual Super Bowl champion New York Giants, denying them a chance at a "three-peat" in the Super Bowl.

Following the 1990 season, the 49ers left team stalwarts Roger Craig and Ronnie Lott unprotected and let them go to the Los Angeles Raiders via Plan B free agency. Joe Montana would remain on the 49ers' roster for the next two seasons, but would never start another game for the 49ers.

Offseason

NFL Draft

Staff

Roster

Regular season

Schedule

Game summaries

Week 6 
 October 14, 1990 – Joe Montana set a 49ers record by throwing for 476 yards in one game and throwing six touchdown passes.
 October 14, 1990 – Jerry Rice set a 49ers record with 5 touchdown receptions and 30 points in one game.

Week 9 
 November 4, 1990 – In a game versus the Green Bay Packers, Joe Montana threw for 411 yards and 3 touchdown passes.

Week 13 vs Giants 

It was the second highest rated Monday Night game ever at the time. The game had a 42% share and a 26.9 rating.

Week 14 
 December 9, 1990 – The 49ers beat the Cincinnati Bengals in overtime. Mike Cofer kicked a 23-yard field goal to give the 49ers a 20–17 victory.

Standings

Playoffs

NFC Divisional Playoff

NFC Championship Game 

Just like the regular season game between the two teams won by the 49ers 7–3, the championship game was mostly a defensive battle. San Francisco running back Roger Craig's fumble with 2:36 left in the game led to Giants kicker Matt Bahr's 42-yard game-winning field goal as time expired. Bahr was New York's only scorer with 5 (of 6) field goals. Despite not scoring a TD in eight quarters against the 49ers, the Giants moved on to Super Bowl XXV with their victory.

Awards and Records 
 Led NFC with 353 points scored
 Charles Haley, Led NFC, Sacks (16)
 Charles Haley, NFC Pro Bowl
 Ronnie Lott, NFC Pro Bowl
 Joe Montana, AP NFL MVP 
 Joe Montana, Associated Press Athlete of the Year
 Joe Montana, NFC Pro Bowl Selection, Injured, did not play
 Joe Montana, Sports Illustrated Sportsman of the Year 
 Guy McIntyre, NFC Pro Bowl
 Jerry Rice, NFL Leader, Receptions (100)
 Jerry Rice, NFL Leader, Receiving Yards (1,502)
 Jerry Rice, NFL Leader, Receiving Touchdowns (13)
 Jerry Rice, NFC Pro Bowl

Milestones 
 Jerry Rice, First 100 reception season

References

External links 
 1990 49ers on Pro Football Reference
 49ers Schedule on jt-sw.com

San Francisco 49ers seasons
NFC West championship seasons
San Francisco
San
1990 in San Francisco